The Georgia Steamers was a soccer club based in Atlanta, Georgia that competed in the SISL and USISL.

Following the 1990/91 indoor season, the team became the Atlanta Quicksilver. For the 1991/92 indoor season, the team was renamed the Atlanta Lightning.

Year-by-year

Quicksilver
Soccer clubs in Georgia (U.S. state)
USISL teams
Defunct indoor soccer clubs in the United States